Monidipa "Mimi" Mondal  (Bengali: মিমি মণ্ডল) is an Indian speculative fiction writer based in New York. She writes in many genres, including science fiction. Mondal is the co-editor of Luminescent Threads: Connections to Octavia E. Butler, an anthology of letters and essays, which received a Locus Award in 2018. It has been nominated for a 2018 Hugo Award, and the William Atheling Jr. Award. Mondal is the first writer from India to have been nominated for the Hugo Award.

Mondal worked as an editor at Penguin India between 2012 and 2013, and as the poetry and reprint editor of Uncanny Magazine between 2017 and 2018. Her work has appeared in such venues as Tor.com, Uncanny Magazine, Fireside Magazine, The Book Smugglers, Daily Science Fiction, Kindle Magazine, Muse India, Podcastle, and Scroll. Mondal is also a history and publishing scholar with a special interest in South Asian speculative fiction, and wrote a two-part history of South Asian speculative fiction for Tor.com in 2018.

Biography
Mondal was born and raised in Kolkata, where her father worked as a West Bengal Civil Services (WBCS) officer and her mother worked at the State Bank of India. Mondal was given the nickname "Mimi" at birth, "like Bengali children usually are," she says in a roundtable interview. From 2015 onwards she has primarily published as "Mimi Mondal" rather than "Monidipa Mondal".

Mondal states in an online essay that her two first languages were Bengali and English. She later learned Hindi, Old English, and small amounts of several other languages.

Education

Mondal attended Nava Nalanda High School, Calcutta International School, and Jadavpur University, receiving a B.A. in English in 2010 and an M.A. in English in 2012. 
She received the 2013 Commonwealth Shared Scholarship in Publishing Studies and attended the University of Stirling, Scotland, 
from which she received a Master of Letters (MLitt) in Publishing Studies in 2015.

In 2015, Mondal attended the Clarion West Writers Workshop in Seattle, US, where she was the Octavia E. Butler Memorial Scholar. In 2017, she completed her MFA in creative writing from Rutgers University.

Luminescent Threads
Luminescent Threads: Connections to Octavia E. Butler (Twelfth Planet Press, August 2017) is a collection of works by more than 40 writers, issued in honor of the 70th anniversary of Octavia E. Butler's birth. It is Mondal's first book-length work. The anthology was co-edited by Mondal and Alexandra Pierce. It consists of memoirs written as if addressed to Butler personally, mixed with more scholarly essays. The title is derived from Butler's novel Patternmaster.

Luminescent Threads was nominated for the 2018 Hugo Award in the category of Best Related Work, and received the Locus Award for Best Non-fiction on 22 June 2018. It is currently nominated for a British Fantasy Award. It was also nominated for a 2018 William J. Atheling Award for Criticism or Review, an Australian Science Fiction Award, being eligible for its Australian editor Pierce and Australian publisher Twelfth Planet Press.

Bibliography

Short fiction

The Other People series (published anachronistically)
Other People (2016)
This Sullied Earth, Our Home (2015)
The Trees of My Youth Grew Tall (2018)
His Footsteps, through Darkness and Light (forthcoming in 2019)

Other stories
So It Was Foretold (2018)
Learning to Swim (2017)
And the Final Frontier is Heaven (2015)
Things to Do after They’re Gone (2015)
The Sea Sings at Night (2015)

Anthology

Luminescent Threads: Connections to Octavia E. Butler (with Alexandra Pierce, 2017)

Essays

A Short History of South Asian Speculative Fiction, Part I and Part II (2018)
On Translating the Stories Yet Unwritten: A Dalit Perspective from India (2017)
Missive from a Woman in a Room in a City in a Country in a World Not Her Own (2017)
 Characters Are Not A Coloring Book Or, Why the Black Hermione is a Poor Apology for the Ingrained Racism of Harry Potter (2016)

References

External links

Year of birth missing (living people)
Living people
Indian science fiction writers
Indian fantasy writers
Writers from Kolkata
Dalit artists
Rutgers University alumni
Indian women writers